HMS Selene was a S-class submarine of the third batch built for the Royal Navy during World War II. She survived the war and was sold for scrap in 1961.

Design and description
The last 17 boats of the third batch were significantly modified from the earlier boats. They had a stronger hull, carried more fuel and their armament was revised. They displaced  on the surface and  submerged. The S-class submarines had a crew of 48 officers and ratings.

For surface running, the boats were powered by two  diesel engines, each driving one propeller shaft. When submerged each propeller was driven by a  electric motor. They could reach  on the surface and  underwater.

Selene was armed with six  torpedo tubes in the bow. She carried six reload torpedoes for a total of a dozen torpedoes. Twelve mines could be carried in lieu of the torpedoes. The boat was also equipped with a  deck gun.

Construction and career
HMS Selene built by Cammell Laird & Co Limited, Birkenhead and launched on 24 April 1944. So far it has been the only ship of the Royal Navy to bear the name Selene. The boat spent most of the Second World War serving in the Far East, where it was used to sink five Japanese sailing vessels and three coasters, and damage another sailing vessel and coaster. It survived the war and in the early 1950s was modified to become a fast unarmed underwater target to train anti-submarine personnel. Its torpedo tubes were covered to streamline its hull, and the three external tubes (two bow, one stern) were removed, as was the gun. Its bridge superstructure was reduced to little more than a blister with a small cockpit in it, and it had only a single periscope. It operated with the Second Submarine Squadron at Portland throughout the 1950s.  It was sold, arriving at Gateshead on 6 June 1961 for breaking up.

Notes

References
 
  
 
 
 

 

British S-class submarines (1931)
1944 ships
Ships built on the River Mersey
World War II submarines of the United Kingdom
Royal Navy ship names